Anne Luise Becke Machado Freitas (born in 1975) is a Brazilian professional female bodybuilder.

Early life 
Anne Freitas was born a middle child, having an older brother and a younger sister. She was intrigued with physical strength at an early age but did not actively pursue physical fitness until her late teens. Over the span of six years, Freitas developed significant gains in her physique. In 2006, Freitas met fitness trainer Ricardo Pannain who encouraged her to enter her first competition two years later.

Bodybuilding career
In 2008, Freitas competed in the figure category and won both state and national competitions. In 2009, she switched to bodybuilding. At age 37, Freitas participated in the 2012’s IFBB Europa Battle Of Champions, where she became champion in her first IFBB event, marking her debut as a pro.

Contest history
2008 State Competition – 1st
2008 National Competition – 1st
2009 South American Competition – 1st
2009 World Championship – 1st (later tested positive and lost the title)
2012 IFBB Europa Battle of Champions – 1st
2012 IFBB Ms. Olympia – 8th
2013 IFBB Toronto Pro Supershow – 2nd
2013 IFBB Ms. Olympia - 9th
2014 IFBB Omaha Pro - 1st
2014 IFBB Ms. Olympia - 6th

Personal life
Freitas is married to Ricardo Pannain and lives in Brazil. Freitas has a daughter named Aimeé. Freitas is fluent in four languages including English, Portuguese, Spanish and French. In her spare time, she plays recreational tennis. She also enjoys Ballet and Jazz.

References

External links
Facebook
The Iron Den.com

1975 births
Brazilian female bodybuilders
Living people
People from Criciúma
Professional bodybuilders